Groß Borstel (Great Borstel) is a quarter of Hamburg, Germany, in the borough of Hamburg-Nord. It is located north of the Eppendorf quarter and south of Hamburg Airport. Near Groß Borstel, the neighbourhood of Klein Borstel, which is not an official quarter, can be found.

Geography
Groß Borstel borders the quarters of Fuhlsbüttel, Ohlsdorf, Alsterdorf, Lokstedt and Niendorf. The Tarpenbek stream flows through Groß Borstel and, in the Hamburg quarter of Eppendorf, into River Alster. The swamp of Eppendorfer Moor is located in the quarter.

History
Groß Borstel was first recorded in the 11th century. The former village can also be found on maps and in documents as Burstolde, Burstelde, Borstel, Bossel, Calebostel and Kahle Borstel. The name derives from Bur, meaning house, and stel, meaning place.

The early 18th century Frustberg House, today known as Stavenhagenhaus, is located in the quarter.

Groß Borstel was incorporated into Hamburg in 1913.

In March 2023, seven people including the gunman were killed and eight others injured in a mass shooting at a Jehovah's Witnesses center on Deelböge street.

Politics
These are the results of Groß Borstel in the Hamburg state election:

References

External links
 Groß Borstel, Hamburg.de

Quarters of Hamburg
Hamburg-Nord